Henry Joseph Steele (May 10, 1860 – March 19, 1933) was a Democratic member of the U.S. House of Representatives from Pennsylvania.

Henry J. Steele was born in Easton, Pennsylvania. He graduated from Stevens College of Business in 1875. He studied law, was admitted to the bar in 1881, and commenced practice in Easton, Pennsylvania. He was a member of the board of education from 1889 to 1893. He served as city solicitor from 1889 to 1895, and as a delegate to the State constitutional convention in 1891. He was president of the Pennsylvania Bar Association in 1914.

Steele was elected as a Democrat to the Sixty-fourth, Sixty-fifth, and Sixty-sixth Congresses. He declined to be a candidate for renomination in 1920. He resumed the practice of law in Easton. He served as a director of the Lehigh Valley Transit Co. and of the Pennsylvania Motor Co. Steele died in Easton and is buried in Easton Cemetery.

Sources
.
Henry Joseph Steele at The Political Graveyard

1860 births
1933 deaths
Democratic Party members of the United States House of Representatives from Pennsylvania
Pennsylvania lawyers
Politicians from Easton, Pennsylvania
School board members in Pennsylvania